İhsaniye is a town of Afyonkarahisar Province in the Aegean region of Turkey. It is the seat of İhsaniye District. Its population is 3,818 (2021). The mayor is Tunay Türkmen (CHP). The town consists of 8 quarters: Cumhuriyet, Şahinler, Hürriyet, Zafer, Susuzosmaniye, Fatih, Yenikent and Akören.

References

Populated places in Afyonkarahisar Province
İhsaniye District
Towns in Turkey